William Evans (17 January 1788  – 8 April 1856) was a Whig politician who  sat in the House of Commons in three periods between 1818 and 1852.

Evans was the son of William Evans of Darley and Elizabeth Strutt who was the daughter of Jedediah Strutt of Belper. The Evans family  had made a fortune from lead mines at Bonsall, and an iron slitting and rolling mill in Derby and a cotton mill at Darley Abbey. They also owned the Evans Bank in Derby. 

Evans was Member of Parliament (MP) for East Retford from 1818 to 1820, and in 1826 unsuccessfully contested Leicester at a cost of between £20,000 and £30,000. In 1830 a compromise was reached and Evans was returned for Leicester without a poll, the same happening in 1831 when Evans was a reformist. Evans was re-elected in the 1832 Reformed parliament, but lost his seat in 1835. He was then elected for North Derbyshire in 1837 and held the seat until 1853, when he resigned by taking the Chiltern Hundreds.

Evans became High Sheriff of Derbyshire in 1829 and was also a Deputy Lieutenant of Derbyshire and J. P. He lived at Allestree Hall and was philanthropic in his support of schools and churches.

Evans married Mary Gisborne, daughter of Rev. Thomas Gisborne of Yoxall Lodge in July 1820. In 1850 he bought Pickford's House in Derby from William Pickford. He left this house to his son Sir Thomas William Evans, 1st Baronet who also became a Member of Parliament.

References

External links 
 

1856 deaths
People from Darley Dale
Whig (British political party) MPs for English constituencies
Members of the Parliament of the United Kingdom for constituencies in Derbyshire
UK MPs 1818–1820
UK MPs 1830–1831
UK MPs 1831–1832
UK MPs 1832–1835
UK MPs 1837–1841
UK MPs 1841–1847
UK MPs 1847–1852
1788 births
Deputy Lieutenants of Derbyshire
High Sheriffs of Derbyshire
People from Derby